Ptolemy's Map of Ireland (140 AD) is thought to be the first map of Ireland in existence. It was created by Ptolemy who almost certainly never visited Ireland but compiled the map based on military, trader and traveller reports and his own mathematical calculations. Given the creation process, the time period involved and the fact that the Greeks and Romans had limited contact with Ireland, it is considered remarkably accurate.

Creation of the map 
The map of Ireland is included on the Prima Europe Tabula section of Ptolemy's Geographia. 

Ireland, or Hibernia, was known to the Romans although not colonised- Tacitus mentioned the island in his writings as "a small country in comparison with Britain, but larger than the islands of the Mediterranean. In soil and climate, and in the character and civilisation of its inhabitants, it is much like Britain". There were Roman colonies in Britain at this period.

Ptolemy, living thousands of miles east of Ireland, produced an interpretation of the world based on the writings available such as texts accessible in the Library of Alexandria. It has been described as "a long exposure photograph" in the sense that it most likely represents points recorded over time (rather than a single incidence or journey), written down and fixed at roughly AD 100.

Methodology 
The work known as the Geographia (also known as the Cosmographia ) included guidelines on how to 'flatten' the image - or represent a 3D object on a 2D surface - of the Earth when constructing maps. Ptolemy believed in a spherical earth within a spherical sky rotating around the sun, and based his calculations of longitudes and latitudes on this foundational principle. Determining the obliquity of the ecliptic, the tilt of the earth relative to the perceived movement of the sun in the sky, his work became "the foundation of all astronomical science" in analysing the angle of the sun during the longest day for locations on different parallels of longitude. 

The work was not well known in the western Roman empire and was lost by the collapse of the empire in the late fifth century. However, there are indications it was known in the eastern Empire. A Greek copy of Geographia was produced in around 1400, and the map is oriented with South at the top.

Precision 
Ptolemy underestimated the length of the equator by 18% and this had an impact on all his maps. One result of this is that his latitudinal estimates are more accurate than his longitudinal ones. The reports he received would have had better directional information (towards the sunrise/sunset, at a left/right angle to the sun at noon) than on distance (five days journey from Gaul). The west coast is poorly represented compared to the other three, and identification of the names Ptolemy gives is speculative. This is consistent with the Romans having less contact with Irish communities in this region.

Communities Identified 
The peoples listed by Ptolemy as inhabiting the north coast are the Wenniknioi in the west and the Rhobogdioi in the east.

Peoples of the west coast are: the Erdinoi near Donegal Bay; the Magnatai or Nagnatai of County Mayo and Sligo; the Auteinoi between County Galway and the Shannon, identifiable with the early medieval Uaithni; the Ganganoi, also known in north Wales, and the Wellaboroi in the far south-west.

Peoples of the south coast are the Iwernoi in the west, who share their name with the island, Iwernia, and can be identified with the early medieval Érainn; the Usdiai, and the Brigantes in the east, who share their name with a people of Roman Britain.

The tribes listed on the east coast are Koriondoi; the Manapioi, possibly related to the Menapii of Gaul; the Kaukoi, probably not related to the Germanic Chauci of the Low Countries; the Eblanoi; the Woluntioi, identifiable with the early medieval Ulaid; and the Darinoi.

Placenames listed and modern equivalents 
Ptolemy references fifteen rivers, six promontories and ten cities. He names and gives the proximate locations of 16 tribes
 Eblana - settlement on the site of modern Dublin
Buvinda - the Boyne River
Senos - the River Shannon
Obboca - River Avoca in Wicklow 
the river Modonnu (possibly the Slaney, but more likely the Avoca), 
Limnos - Lambay Island
Ivernis - Cashel, County Tipperary
Raeba - possibly the royal site of Cruchain
the river Logia - Belfast Lough, Loch Laoigh in Irish.
the river Rhawiu - the Erne;
Dur  - Dingle Bay
Iernu - the Kenmare 
the river Widwa - the Foyle
the river Argita - the Bann
the Rhobogdion promontory - Fair Head, County Antrim.

Placenames listed without clear modern equivalents 

 the promontory Isamnion (East coast)
 the river Winderios (possibly Carlingford Lough, Dundrum Bay or Strangford Lough)
 the town of Manapia (a settlement of the Manapii)
 the town Magnata (a settlement of the Magnatai people, possibly somewhere in County Sligo); 
the mouth of the river Libniu (possibly Clew Bay)
Ausoba (perhaps Galway Bay)
Senu (probably the Shannon, although placed too far to the north), 
The river Dabrona (possibly the Lee or the Blackwater) 
The River Birgu (probably the Barrow)

Legacy 
A woodcut of the map from 1486, thought to be one of the earliest surviving reproductions of the map, was bought by the National Library of Wales Aberystwyth in 2008.

References

Maps of Ireland
Ptolemy